La Hora is the newspaper with the most regional editions in Ecuador. It specializes in regional news, and runs a total of 10 regional editions. The headquarters of La Hora are located in Quito.

See also
List of newspapers in Ecuador

References

External links
 

Spanish-language newspapers
Newspapers published in Ecuador
Mass media in Quito